Z̀ (minuscule: z̀) is a letter of the Latin alphabet, formed from Z with the addition of a grave accent. It is used in the Old Welsh and Wenzhounese alphabets.

See also
 Grave accent
 rz (digraph)

References 

Latin letters with diacritics
Phonetic transcription symbols